Leonid Sergeyevich Bronevoy (December 17, 1928 – December 9, 2017) was a Soviet and Russian actor. Though primarily a stage actor in the Lenkom Theatre, Bronevoy also made occasional appearances in films. He was named People's Artist of the USSR in 1987 and won the Nika Award in March 2008.

Early life 
Bronevoy was born in Kyiv on December 17, 1928, into the Jewish family of Solomon Iosifovich Bronevoy (who changed his family name from Faktorovich) and Bella Lvovna Bronevaya. In his childhood, he learned to play violin under the instruction of  Kyiv Conservatory professor David Solomonovich Berthier.

His father, Solomon Bronevoy, came from the family of a confectioner from Odessa and had participated in the Russian Civil War. From 1920 to 1923, he worked at the State Political Directorate and completed his legal education in Kyiv, where he met Bella Bronevaya, a student in the economics department. Solomon Bronevoy worked at the Institute of National Economy until his dismissal on Trotskyism charges. In 1928, before the birth of his son, Solomon got a job in the Kyiv District economic department of the Prosecutor General's Office, with the help of his elder brother Alexander Iosifovich Bronevoy. Later, Solomon Iosifovich was sent to Ivanovo. In 1933 he was awarded the Order of the Red Star, and in 1934, he was appointed director of the sixth Department in the USSR's People's Commissariat for Internal Affairs (NKVD). In 1935, he was dismissed from the NKVD and was appointed chief of Kyiv's "culture and park recreation." 

On September 13, 1936, Solomon was arrested, and on March 9, 1937, he was sentenced to five years in prison (after the extension of the term, he was released in 1946). Solomon's wife divorced him and changed their son's patronym to "Sergeyevich", but that did not help. As a "family of an enemy of the people", she and her son Leonid were sent into exile in Malmyzh.

In 1941, the family was allowed to return to Kyiv, but due to World War II, they were evacuated to the city of Chimkent, Kazakh SSR, where Leonid Bronevoy attended high school and began to work independently.

Acting career 
In 1950, Leonid graduated from the Alexander Ostrovsky Tashkent Theatrical Art Institute. After his graduation in 1950, he worked in Magnitogorsk and Orenburg drama theatres.

In 1953, Leonid went to Moscow where he was able to immediately enter the third year of the Moscow Art Theater School (class of A.M. Karev) and successfully completed it in 1955. After completing theatre school, Leonid left Moscow and was admitted into the Grozny Drama Theatre. He acted at the Irkutsk , and Voronezh .

Starting in 1988 he performed in Moscow at the Lenkom Theatre.

Bronevoy achieved star status in the USSR after playing the role of Heinrich Müller in the TV series Seventeen Moments of Spring. Despite lacking a physical resemblance to the historical chief of Gestapo, his portrayal became iconic due to his natural charisma and sense of humor.

Bronevoy's equally popular characters include the role of the Doctor in the comedy Formula of Love and that of the Duke of Hanover in The Very Same Munchhausen. 

Bronevoy subsequently played over 20 roles in films. The last was the role of an old actor in Simple Things, for which he received the Nika Award in March 2008.

His name appeared on a petition against the Russian annexation of Crimea. However, he told TASS that his name was placed without his permission, adding that he supported Vladimir Putin and Russian actions in Crimea.

He died at his home on 9 December 2017, a week before his 89th birthday.

Partial filmography 

 Comrade Arseny (1964) as Gendarme colonel
 Lebedev vs Lebedev (1965) as Yevgeny Viktorovich
 Your Contemporary (1967) as Minister secretary
 Investigation Held by ZnaToKi (1971—1972, TV Series) as Kudrjashov, restaurant director
 Acting As... (1973) as Tugodayev
 Seventeen Moments of Spring (1973, TV Mini-Series) as Heinrich Müller
 Just Several Words In Honour Of Mr. de Molière (1973, TV Movie) as Louis XIV of France
 Ispolnyayushchiy obyazannosti (1973)
 Did you call a doctor?  (1974) as Leonid S. Medvedev, Professor, Head of therapeutic clinic
 'A' For the Summer (1974) as Stepan Petrovich, cook, speaking in verse
 Tanya (1974, TV Movie) as Semyon Semyonovich Vasin
 Pyatyorka za leto (1974)
 Concerto for Two Violins (1975) as professor Leonid Medvedev
 Olga Sergeyevna (1975) as Tyutyaev
 Request to Speak (1975) as Petr Altukhov, former chairman
 Mayakovsky Laughs or Bedbug-75 (1976) as Oleg Bayan
 Proshu slova (1976) as Pyotr Vasilyevich Antukhov
 Armed and Very Dangerous (1977) as Peter Dumphy
 Savoy Hijacking (1979) as Jean Challot
 The Very Same Munchhausen (1979) as Duke
 We Aren't So Old! (1980) as Mikhail Ostashenko
 Kakie nashi gody! (1981)
 Agony (1981) as Ivan Manasevich-Manuilov
 Return Of Resident (1982) as Johann Staube
 Pokrovsky Gates (1982, TV Movie) as Arkady Velyurov
 If to Believe Lopotukhin (1983) as Yuri Leonidovich, the headmaster / humanoid
 A Month in the Country (1983) as Ignatius Ilyich Sрhpigelsky
 Formula of Love (1984) as Doctor
 Chicherin (1986) as Maxim Litvinov
 Final of the Resident Mission (1986) as Johann Staube
 Mysteriuous Inheritor (1987) as Civil law notary
 Big Game (1988) as Vernier
 The Physicists (1989) as Newton
 Promised Heaven (1991) as Colonel Semen Yefremovich
 Old Young People (1992) as Viktor Maksimovich, deputy
 Italian Contract (1993) as Don Lucino
 Equals to four France (1996, TV Series)  as Shakhmatov
 Schizophrenia (1997) as sartor
 Ship of Doubles (1997) as general of FSB
 Simple things (2007) as Vladimir Mikhailovich Zhuravlev
 Guilty Without Fault (2008) as Mendelsson

Voice in animation 
 Plasticine Crow (1981) as Grandpa
 Investigation Held by Kolobki (1986-1987) as Boss (in parts 1 and 2)

Honours and awards
 Honored Artist of the RSFSR (1971)
 People's Artist of the RSFSR (1979)
 People's Artist of the USSR (1987)
 People's Artist of Ukraine (2013)
 Order of the Red Banner of Labour (1982)
 Order "For Merit to the Fatherland";
1st class (13 September 2013)
2nd class (1 December 2008, the award ceremony was held on December 17) for outstanding contributions to the development of domestic theatrical and cinematic arts, many years of creative activity
3rd class (17 December 2003) for outstanding contribution to the development of national art
4th class (25 August 1997) a great contribution to the development of theatrical arts
 State Prize of the Russian Federation in Literature and Art in 1996 (29 May 1997)
 Vasilyev Brothers State Prize of the RSFSR (1976) for his role of Heinrich Müller in the television series Seventeen Moments of Spring

References

External links 
 

1928 births
2017 deaths
20th-century Russian male actors
21st-century Russian male actors
Actors from Kyiv
Moscow Art Theatre School alumni
Honored Artists of the RSFSR
People's Artists of the RSFSR
People's Artists of the USSR
Recipients of the Nika Award
Full Cavaliers of the Order "For Merit to the Fatherland"
Recipients of the Order of the Red Banner of Labour
Recipients of the title of People's Artists of Ukraine
Recipients of the Vasilyev Brothers State Prize of the RSFSR
State Prize of the Russian Federation laureates
Jewish Russian actors
Ukrainian Jews
Russian people of Ukrainian-Jewish descent
Russian male film actors
Russian male stage actors
Russian male voice actors
Soviet male film actors
Soviet male stage actors
Soviet male voice actors
Burials at Novodevichy Cemetery